The women's 3 metre springboard, also reported as springboard diving, was one of four diving events on the diving at the 1936 Summer Olympics programme.

The competition, held on Wednesday 12 August, was split into two sets of dives held on the same day:

Compulsory dives
Divers performed three pre-chosen dives – a running straight somersault forward, standing header backward with pike, and running straight isander-half gainer. 
Facultative dives
Divers performed three dives of their choice (from different categories and different from the compulsory).

Sixteen divers from nine nations competed.

Results

References

Sources
 
 

Women
1936
1936 in women's diving
Div